This article is a list of notable individuals who were born in and/or have lived in Westminster, Colorado.

Arts and entertainment

Film, television, and theatre
Frank Caeti (1973- ), actor and comedian
George D. "Pete" Morrison (1890–1973), silent film actor

Music
Bryan Erickson (1972- ), electronic musician
Omar Espinosa (1984- ), musician and composer

Business
Frank Willis Mayborn (1903–1987), newspaper publisher

Politics

National
Don Leroy Bonker (1937- ), U.S. Representative from Washington
Roy Harrison McVicker (1924–1973), U.S. Representative from Colorado

State
Evie Hudak (1951- ), Colorado state legislator
Cherylin Peniston (1948- ), Colorado state legislator
Robert Ramirez, Colorado state legislator
Pat Steadman (1964- ), Colorado state legislator

Religion
Alma Bridwell White (1862–1946), founder and bishop of the Pillar of Fire Church
Donald Justin Wolfram (1919–2003), general superintendent of the Pillar of Fire Church

Sports
Mariah Bell (1996- ), figure skater
Sean Jarrett (1983- ), baseball pitcher
Derrick Martin (1985- ), football safety
Michael A. Mulyar (1978- ), chess master
Lars Sullivan, former WWE wrestler and adult film actor
Rose Namajunas, mixed martial artist and former UFC champion
Pat Barry, former kickboxer and MMA fighter

References

Westminster, Colorado
Westminster